Daniel Bernard Roumain (known by his initials, DBR; born 1970) is a classically trained composer, performer, violinist, and band-leader, whose work combines classical music with jazz, hip-hop and rock.

Composer
In September 2010, Dancers, Dreamers, and Presidents — an orchestral tone poem inspired by Ellen DeGeneres and then-senator Barack Obama — premiered at the New World Symphony.

DBR composed the opera, "We Shall Not Be Moved," in collaboration with librettist Marc Bamuthi Joseph, and director and choreographer Bill T. Jones. The opera premiered at Opera Philadelphia on September 16, 2017.

Discography
Threads with David S. Ware (Thirsty Ear, 2003)
I, Composer (2004)
String Quartet (2004)
Pulsing (DBR Music, 2006)
Etudes4Violin&Electronix (Thirsty Ear, 2007)
The Need to Be with Ryuichi Sakamoto on the DJ Spooky album "Sound Unbound" (2008)
Woodbox Beats & Balladry (Thirsty Ear, 2010)

References

External links

Guide to the Daniel Bernard Roumain Collection, Center for Black Music Research, Columbia College Chicago
Collision: Bill T. Jones and Daniel Bernard Roumain
Interview on CBS News
Performing at Cusp Conference 2009 (video)

1970 births
Living people
American classical composers
American male classical composers
American musicians of Haitian descent
Musicians from Florida
Thirsty Ear Recordings artists
University of Michigan School of Music, Theatre & Dance alumni
Vanderbilt University alumni